"Reason" is the sixth episode of the first season of the South Korean anthology series KBS Drama Special. Starring Lee Bo-hee and Greena Park, it aired on KBS2 on July 3, 2010.

Plot
Kim Ji-soo married a man who her father approved of but she does not love just to get away from her strict father. On the day she tells her husband she wants a divorce, he has a car accident. Since then, she has been taking care of him who is in a vegetative state. She finds little reason to live and go through life in a routine manner until she meets Park Song-yi, a new caregiver, and her life changes.

Cast
Lee Bo-hee as Kim Ji-soo
Greena Park as Park Song-yi
Choi Jung-woo as Professor Lee, Ji-soo's colleague and lover
Kim Na-woon as Ji-soo's sister-in-law

Episode ratings

Source: TNS Media Korea

References

External links
 
 KBS Drama Special at KBS World

2010 South Korean television episodes